Castillo de Lerés or Castillo de Leres is a locality located in the municipality of Sabiñánigo, in Huesca province, Aragon, Spain. As of 2020, it has a population of 4.

Geography 
Castillo de Lerés is located 39km north of Huesca.

References

Populated places in the Province of Huesca